Gençosman is a village in the Aksaray District, Aksaray Province, Turkey. Its population is 896 (2021). Aksaray city centre is only  to the south.

References

Villages in Aksaray District